Caridina serratirostris is a species of freshwater shrimp that lives in the Indo-west Pacific region, from Madagascar to Fiji, including northern Queensland, Australia, which may be a different subspecies. Its common name in the aquarium trade, "ninja shrimp", comes from its ability to quickly change colour and disappear into its surroundings like a ninja.

References

External links

Atyidae
Freshwater crustaceans of Asia
Freshwater crustaceans of Australia
Crustaceans described in 1892
Taxa named by Johannes Govertus de Man